Veedhi is a 2006 Telugu-language film directed by V Dorairaj. The film stars Sharwanand and Gopika with newcomers Nataraj, Santhosh, and Aryan in important roles. Vinay Varma plays a negative role.

Cast 

 Sharwanand as Surya
 Gopika as Seetha Mahalakshmi
 Vinay Varma as Sivanna
 Nataraj 
 Santosh
 Aryan
 M.S. Narayana 
 Rallapalli
 Brahmanandam
 Delhi Rajeswari
 Master Siva Varma
 Harsha Vardhan 
 Mannava Balayya
 Pilla Prasad
 Kondavalasa
 Jayalalita
 Dil Ramesh
 Jeeva
 Apoorva
 Kanchi
 P.D. Raju
 Siva Krishna
 Vinod Kumar
 Rajyalakshmi
 Mallikarjuna Rao

Production 
The story is based on a true incident that happened in Bihar. The shooting of the film ended on 3 June 2006. Raju Voopati, who previously directed Dham rechristened himself as  V Dorairaj for this film. The film is produced by Ushakiran Movies and has music by Anup Rubens. This film marks Rubens's second collaboration with Ushakiran Movies after Chitram (2000).

Release 
The film was scheduled to release at the end of June, but was delayed.

The film released to mixed reviews from critics.

Sify gave the film a rating of three out of five and wrote that "Veedhi is a dead end and most inept movie of the year award should go to its director Dorairaj". The Full Hyderabad wrote that "The film has lesser logic than a bowl of goldfish – what lend it some platform of watchability are the performances". On the contrary, the critic praised the comedy sequences and performances of the newcomers.

References

External links 
 

2006 films
2000s Telugu-language films
Indian action drama films
2006 action drama films